Rubikon is a German online magazine founded in 2017. It mainly deals with current political events, some of which are commented on in the form of conspiracy theories. The editor-in-chief is Jens Wernicke.

Economic and legal basis 
Rubikon is operated by a non-profit company called Initiative zur Demokratisierung der Meinungsbildung (Initiative for the Democratization of Opinion Formation) and is based in Mainz. Content on the website is written by independent journalists all over the world. The website is entirely financed by donations. All company shares are in the sole ownership of editor-in-chief Wernicke, who is also the sole managing director. German publicist Wolf Wetzel, who wrote at Rubikon from its foundation until his departure in 2018, criticized this construction for having „eine [...] klare [...] Hierarchie“ ("a [...] clear [...] hierarchy"): „Gesellschafter, Herausgeber, Geschäftsführer, Chefredakteur. Von »unten« gibt es kein Durchkommen, kein Gegengewicht, keine Form der »Gewaltenteilung«, keine Möglichkeit, den Kurs zu beeinflussen. Das Ganze hängt folglich ganz vom Goodwill des Herausgebers und Geschäftsführers ab, der sich gleichzeitig den Posten des Chefredakteurs zugedacht hat“ ("Shareholder, publisher, managing director, editor-in-chief. From »below« there is no getting through, no counterweight, no form of »separation of powers«, no possibility of influencing the course. The whole thing therefore depends entirely on the goodwill of the publisher and managing director, who has also intended to be editor-in-chief"). According to him, no effective influence is possible via the editorial statute.

Reception

Scientific reception 
The Americanist Michael Butter includes Rubikon in the alternative media with outlets such as KenFM, Telepolis or NachDenkSeiten, which would all form a counter-public to the traditional quality media and public broadcasting. They used conspiracy theories like that of the "lying press" and sold them as serious news.

Journalistic reception 
When the website was launched for three months in 2017, the journalist Christiane Enkeler told Deutschlandfunk that the magazine presented itself as „sehr heterogen“ ("very heterogeneous"). According to her, the critical analysis of leading media was successful. Overall, Rubikon would still be in development.

Simon Hurtz referred to the website in the Süddeutsche Zeitung in 2020 as „Querfront-Magazin“ ("Third Position magazine"). Roger Schawinski calls it an „Internetportal mit Verschwörungstheoretiker-Groove“ ("Internet portal with a conspiracy theorist groove").

According to Erik Peter from Die Tageszeitung, during the COVID-19 pandemic, Rubikon became a platform for the conspiracy scene in Berlin that negated the danger of the virus. Der Spiegel called Rubikon „eine Art Hausmedium der Protestler“ ("a kind of in-house media for protesters") around Anselm Lenz, in which „verschwörungsideologische Beiträge“ ("contributions to the ideology of conspiracies") were published again and again.

References

External links 

 Official website (in German)

German news websites